The 1976–77 season was the 31st season in Rijeka's history and their 15th season in the Yugoslav First League. Their 11th place finish in the 1975–76 season meant it was their third successive season playing in the Yugoslav First League.

Competitions

Yugoslav First League

Classification

Results summary

Results by round

Matches

First League

Source: rsssf.com

Yugoslav Cup

Source: rsssf.com

Squad statistics
Competitive matches only.

See also
1976–77 Yugoslav First League
1976–77 Yugoslav Cup

References

External sources
 1976–77 Yugoslav First League at rsssf.com
 Prvenstvo 1976.-77. at nk-rijeka.hr

HNK Rijeka seasons
Rijeka